is a solar power generating station in the Mutsu-Ogawara Industrial Park, Rokkasho, Aomori Prefecture, Japan. Comprising two solar fields about five kilometres apart from one another, the facility has a nameplate capacity of 148 MW, and a "grid capacity" of 115 MW. It was previously the largest operational solar plant in Japan, but has since been surpassed in size.

History
Construction began in August 2013. The power plant was engineered and constructed by Shimizu Corporation. It was commissioned on 1 October 2015.

Facilities
The station occupies 253 hectares of land on two different sites about five kilometres apart. The inland "Chitosedairakita Area" generates about 55MW. The "Takahoko Area", near the ocean, generates about 60MW. This amounts to a total of 115 MW contributed to the power grid. The power plant's solar panels have a nameplate capacity of 148 MW.

Altogether, the plant comprises approximately 510,000 solar panels. Electricity generated from both sites is carried to the Rokkasho transformer station of Tohoku Electric Power. The plant uses single-crystal silicon photovoltaic cells made by Mitsubishi Electric and SunPower.

There is also a visitor's centre.

Ownership and operations
The plant is owned by Eurus Rokkasho Solar Park Corporation, a subsidiary of the commercial energy producer Eurus Energy. It is maintained and operated by Eurus Technical Service Corporation.

See also
 List of power stations in Japan
 Solar power in Japan

References

2015 establishments in Japan
Buildings and structures in Aomori Prefecture
Photovoltaic power stations in Japan
Rokkasho, Aomori
Energy infrastructure completed in 2015